Prisoner's Daughter is a 2022 drama film written by Mark Bacci and directed by Catherine Hardwicke, starring Kate Beckinsale and Brian Cox. The film premiered at the 2022 TIFF and received mixed reviews from critics.

Plot 
The film centers on an imprisoned man's (Brian Cox) attempts to reconnect with his daughter (Kate Beckinsale) after being diagnosed with terminal pancreatic cancer.

Cast 
 Kate Beckinsale as Maxine
 Brian Cox as Max
 Ernie Hudson
 Christopher Convery as Ezra
 Tyson Ritter

Production 
The film was produced by Sam Okun, Marina Grasic, and David Haring. In August 2021, Deadline announced that Tyson Ritter was joining the cast alongside Beckinsale and Cox.

Release 
The film had its world premiere on September 14, 2022, at the 2022 Toronto International Film Festival.

Reception 
The film received mixed reviews from critics, who praised its cast but criticized the screenplay, and has a score of 60% on review aggregator Rotten Tomatoes. Lovia Gyarke of The Hollywood Reporter gave the film a mixed review, praising its cast and direction while criticizing its uneven screenplay, pivot from the drama to the action genre in the second act, and for not adequately fleshing out its characters. Wendy Ide of ScreenDaily wrote that "There are very few surprises in this formulaic domestic drama, but there are pleasures to be had in watching."

Robert Daniels in a review for Rogerebert.com gave the film a mostly negative review, writing that it "disappointingly undermines its own themes and characters at every turn."

Marya E. Gates of ThePlaylist.net was critical of the film, stating that the performances of Cox and Beckinsale were some of the film's only highlights.

References

External links 
 

2022 drama films
American prison films
Films about cancer in the United States
Films directed by Catherine Hardwicke